The black-chinned mountain tanager (Anisognathus notabilis) is a species of bird in the family Thraupidae.
It is found in Colombia and Ecuador.
Its natural habitat is subtropical or tropical moist montane forests.

References

black-chinned mountain tanager
Birds of the Colombian Andes
Birds of the Ecuadorian Andes
black-chinned mountain tanager
black-chinned mountain tanager
Taxonomy articles created by Polbot